Joe Walsh is an American rock guitarist, singer and songwriter who has been a member of three successful bands: James Gang, Eagles, and Ringo Starr & His All-Starr Band. He has also recorded solo. His highest charting song is "A Life of Illusion", which reached number-one on Hot Mainstream Rock Tracks.

Discography

James Gang albums

Barnstorm albums

Eagles albums

Solo albums

Compilation albums

Albums with REO Speedwagon

Albums with Ringo Starr

Other album appearances
{| class="wikitable"
|-
!Year
!Artist
!Album
|-
|1967
|The Ohio Express 
|"Beg, Borrow and Steal" LP by 
(vocals/guitar on "I Find I Think Of You" and "And It's True,")
|-
|1970
|B.B. King 
|Indianola Mississippi Seeds(Guest artist, rhythm guitar)
|-
|1973
|Manassas
|Down the Road(Slide guitar)
|-
|1973
|America
|Hat Trick(guitar on Green Monkey)
|-
|1973
|Michael Stanley
|Rosewood Bitters(Slide guitar)
|-
| 1973
|Michael Stanley
|Friends and Legends(performed on most songs on album)
|-
| 1973
|Rick Derringer
|All American Boy(performed on "Teenage Queen")
|-
| 1974
|Billy Preston
|The Kids and Me|-
|1974
|Dan Fogelberg
|Souvenirs(Walsh performed on and produced this album)
|-
|1974
|Joe Vitale
|Roller Coaster Weekend|-
|1975
|Keith Moon
|Two Sides of the Moon(Walsh played electric guitar on four songs.) 
|-
|1976
|Fools Gold
|Fools Gold(Walsh performed on and produced this album with Glenn Frey and Glyn Johns. Walsh played guitar on "Coming Out Of Hiding")
|-
|1977
|Al Kooper
|Act Like Nothing's Wrong(Slide guitar on "Hollywood Vampire")
|-
|1977
|Andy Gibb
|Flowing Rivers|-
|1977
|Randy Newman
|Little Criminals
|-
|1977
|Jay Ferguson
|Thunder Island|-
|1977
|Emerson, Lake and Palmer
|Works Vol 1 - L.A. Nights With Keith Emerson on keyboards.
|-
|1979
|Jay Ferguson
|Real Life Ain't This Way|-
|1980
|Warren Zevon
|Bad Luck Streak in Dancing School|-
|1980
|Beach Boys
|Keepin' the Summer Alive(Walsh played guitar on the title track)
|-
|1981
|John Entwistle
|Too Late the Hero(Walsh performed on and produced this album)
|-
|1981
|Joe Vitale
|Plantation Harbor|-
|1982
|Don Henley
|I Can't Stand Still(Walsh performed the 1st guitar solo on "Dirty Laundry")
|-
|1982
|Lionel Richie
|Lionel Richie(Electric guitar and guitar solos on "Wandering Stranger")
|-
|1984
|Timothy B. Schmit
|Playin' It Cool(Slide guitar, electric guitar)
|-
|1985
|Michael McDonald
|No Lookin' Back(Guest artist, slide guitar)
|-
|1986
|Steve Winwood
|Back in the High Life(Co-writer and guitar on "Split Decision")
|-
|1986
|Albert Collins 
|Jazzvisions: Jump The Blues Away|-
|1987
|Richard Marx
|Richard Marx(Slide guitar on "Don't Mean Nothing")
|-
|1990
|Wilson Phillips
|Wilson Phillips(Solo slide and rhythm guitar on "Impulsive" additional guitar on "Hold On" and "A Reason to Believe")
|-
|1990
|Herbs
|Homegrown(Walsh played and sang on, wrote for and produced this album; it includes the original versions of "Up All Night", "Ordinary Average Guys" (sung by Herbs bassist Charlie Tumahai) and "It's Alright")
|-
|1991
|Bob Seger
|The Fire Inside(Guitar, 12 string guitar)
|-
|1993
|Paul Shaffer
|The World's Most Dangerous Party(Guest artist, vocals)
|-
|1995
|Various
|A Future to This Life: Robocop – The Series Soundtrack(Three songs, including the title track in a duet with Lita Ford)
|-
|1998
|Fleetwood Mac
|Live in Boston Volume Two(guitar)
|-
|2000
|Rick Danko
|Times Like These(Guest artist, guitar, piano, backing vocals)
|-
|2006
|Frankie Miller
|Long Way Home|-
|2012
|Ringo Starr
|Ringo 2012(Lead parts on "Wings")
|-
|2012
|Kix Brooks
|New to This Town(Lead parts on the single "New to This Town")
|-
|2014
|Foo Fighters
|Sonic Highways(Guest guitar solo on "Outside")
|}

Eagles songs written by Joe Walsh

Eagles studio recordings featuring Joe Walsh on lead vocal

Note: Other songs in the Eagles catalog that were sung and written by Walsh include "Life's Been Good" and "All Night Long", from Walsh's solo career, which were included on Eagles Live, and "Funk #49", from Walsh's days in the James Gang, was included on the fourth "Millennium Concert" disc of the Eagles box set Selected Works: 1972-1999. The band has also been known to play "Rocky Mountain Way," as seen on the Farewell Tour I'' DVD. These are not Eagles songs however, since the studio cuts did not originate under the Eagles name.

Singles

Guest singles

Other charted songs

References

Discographies of American artists
Rock music discographies